Nikolay Vasiliyevich Vdovichenko (born 21 April 1989) is a Russian former professional football player forward. He plays for FC Dynamo Vologda.

Club career
In September 2020, he signed a contract with the Moldovan club FC Codru Lozova.
He made his Moldovan Super Liga debut for FC Codru Lozova on 20 September 2020 in a game against FC Sfîntul Gheorghe.

In February 2021 he signed a contract with JK Narva Trans.

In April 2022, he signed a one-year contract with FC Dynamo Vologda.

References

External links
 

1989 births
Living people
Russian people of Ukrainian descent
Russian footballers
Association football forwards
FC Khimik Dzerzhinsk players
FC Tekstilshchik Ivanovo players
FC Orenburg players
FC Gornyak Uchaly players
FC KAMAZ Naberezhnye Chelny players
FC Volga Nizhny Novgorod players
FC Spartak Kostroma players
FC Dynamo Bryansk players
FC Codru Lozova players
JK Narva Trans players
FC Dynamo Vologda players